Plugs and sockets for electrical appliances not hardwired to mains electricity originated in the United Kingdom in the 1870s and were initially two-pin designs. These were usually sold as a mating pair, but gradually de facto and then official standards arose to enable the interchange of compatible devices. British standards have proliferated throughout large parts of the former British Empire.

BS 546, Two-pole and earthing-pin plugs, socket-outlets and socket-outlet adaptors for AC (50–60 Hz) circuits up to 250 V is a British Standard for three-pin AC power plugs and sockets. Originally published in April 1934, it was updated by a 1950 edition which is still current, with eight amendments up to 1999. BS 546 is also the precursor of current Indian and South African plug standards. The 5 A version has been designated as Type D and the 15 A as Type M in the IEC 60083 plugs and sockets standard. BS 546 plugs and sockets are still permitted in the UK, provided the socket has shutters.
In the United Kingdom and in Ireland this system is usually referred to by its pin shape and is simply known as "round pin plugs" or "round pin sockets". It is often associated with obsolete wiring installations or where it is found in modern wiring, it is confined to special use cases, particularly for switch controlled lamps and stage lighting.

BS 1363, 13 A plugs socket-outlets adaptors and connection units is a British Standard which specifies the most common type of single-phase AC power plugs and sockets that are used in the United Kingdom. It has been adopted in many former British colonies and protectorates. BS 1363 was introduced in 1947 as one of the new standards for electrical wiring in the United Kingdom used for post-war reconstruction. The plug and socket replaced the BS 546 plug and socket, which are still found in old installations or in special applications. BS 1363 plugs have been designated as Type G in the IEC 60083 plugs and sockets standard.
In the United Kingdom and in Ireland, this system is usually referred to simply as a "13 amp plug" or a "13 amp socket".

Concepts and terminology

The International Electrotechnical Commission publishes IEC 60050, the International Electrotechnical Vocabulary.

Generally the plug is the movable connector attached to an electrically operated device's mains cable, and the socket is fixed on equipment or a building structure and connected to an energised electrical circuit. The plug has protruding pins (referred to as male) that fit into matching apertures (called female) in the sockets. A plug is defined in IEC 60050 as an "accessory having pins designed to engage with the contacts of a socket-outlet, also incorporating means for the electrical connection and mechanical retention of flexible cables or cords". A plug therefore does not contain components which modify the electrical output from the electrical input (except where a switch or fuse is provided as a means of disconnecting the output from input). There is an erroneous tendency to refer to power conversion devices with incorporated plug pins as plugs, but IEC 60050 refers to these as 'direct plug-in equipment' defined as "equipment in which the mains plug forms an integral part of the equipment enclosure so that the equipment is supported by the mains socket-outlet". In this article, the term 'plug' is used in the sense defined by IEC 60050. Sockets are designed to prevent exposure of bare energised contacts.

To reduce the risk of users accidentally touching energized conductors and thereby experiencing electric shock, plug and socket systems often incorporate safety features in addition to the recessed contacts of the energized socket. These include plugs with insulated sleeves, sockets with blocking shutters, and sockets designed to accept only compatible plugs inserted in the correct orientation.

The term plug is in general and technical use in all forms of English, common alternatives being power plug, electric plug, and plug top. The normal technical term for an AC power socket is socket-outlet, but in non-technical common use a number of other terms are used. The general term is socket, but there are numerous common alternatives, including power point, plug socket, wall socket, and wall plug. Modern British sockets for domestic use are normally manufactured as single or double units with an integral face plate and are designed to fit standard mounting boxes.

Electrical sockets for single phase domestic, commercial and light industrial purposes generally provide three electrical connections to the supply conductors. These are termed neutral, line and earth. Both neutral and line carry current and are defined as live parts. Neutral is usually at or very near to earth potential, being earthed either at the substation or at the service entrance (neutral-to-earth bonding is not permitted in the distribution board/consumer unit). Line (commonly, but technically incorrectly, called live) carries the full supply voltage relative to the neutral. The protective earth connection allows the exposed metal parts of the appliance to be connected to earth, providing protection to the user should those exposed parts inadvertently come into contact with any live parts within the appliance. Historically, two-pin sockets without earth were used in Britain, but their use is now restricted to sockets specifically designated for shavers and toothbrushes.

An adaptor (in the context of plugs and sockets) is defined in IEC 60050 as "a portable accessory constructed as an integral unit incorporating both a plug portion and one or more socket-outlet portions". (There is an alternative spelling, 'adapter', but adaptor is the form usually used in standards and official documents.)

Common characteristics
There are certain characteristics common to British mains plugs and sockets intended for domestic use. The brass pins appear relatively solid and large compared to others. British Standards for plugs (with the exception of BS 4573) have always specified side entry flex (entry in other types is usually parallel to the axes of the pins). Since 1934, the contacts of a socket have been specified in terms of the pins of the plug, rather than by specifying the contact dimensions. The pins of both round pin and rectangular pin plugs are arranged in a triangular fashion, the earth pin being the larger and longer pin at the apex. Earthed sockets are designed to be incompatible with two-pin plugs. Both BS 546 and BS 1363 sockets, when viewed from the front with the earth uppermost, have the line aperture at the lower right.

British plugs and sockets regulatory system

A Statutory Instrument, the Plugs and Sockets etc. (Safety) Regulations 1987, was introduced to specifically regulate plugs and sockets in the United Kingdom. This was revised by the Plugs and Sockets etc. (Safety) Regulations 1994. The guidance notes to the 1994 regulations state:

The regulations include a requirement that all plug types must be tested and certified by a nominated approval body (normally BSI, ASTA-Intertek or NEMKO). They also require that all mains appliances for domestic use in the UK be supplied with approved BS 1363 plugs, but there is an exception for plugs fitted to shavers and toothbrushes which are normally a UK shaver plug (BS 4573) but may also be a Europlug (BS EN 50075). The regulations also contain a provision for the approval of non-BS 1363 conforming plugs when "the plugs are constructed using an alternative method of construction which provides an equivalent level of safety in respect of any risk of death or personal injury to plugs which conform to BS 1363 and is such that plugs of that type may reasonably be expected to be safe in use". Certifying bodies have used this provision by developing their own standards for novel devices, thus allowing the introduction of innovative developments; an example is the plastic ISOD (insulated shutter opening device) which was originally approved against either an ASTA Standard or the BSI PAS 003 before becoming incorporated into BS 1363-1:1995.

There is no European Union regulation of domestic mains plugs and sockets; the Low Voltage Directive specifically excludes domestic plugs and sockets. As such, no relevant retained EU law applies. EU countries each have their own regulations and national standards and CE marking is neither applicable nor permitted on plugs and sockets. Despite this CE marking is sometimes fraudulently used, especially on universal sockets.

Early history

When electricity was first introduced into houses, it was primarily used for lighting. As electricity became a common method of operating labour-saving appliances, a safe means of connection to the electric system other than using a light socket was needed. According to British author John Mellanby the first plug and socket in England was introduced by T. T. Smith in 1883, and there were two-pin designs by 1885, one of which appears in the (British) General Electric Company catalogue of 1889. Gustav Binswanger, a German Jewish immigrant who founded the General Electric Company, obtained a patent (GB189516898) in 1895 for a plug and socket using a concentric (co-axial) contact system.

The earthed consumer plug has several claimants to its invention. A 1911 book dealing with the electrical products of A. P. Lundberg & Sons of London describes the Tripin earthed plug available in 2.5 A and 5 A models. The pin configuration of the Tripin appears virtually identical to modern BS 546 plugs. In her 1914 book Electric cooking, heating, cleaning, etc Maud Lucas Lancaster mentions an earthed iron-clad plug and socket by the English firm of A. Reyrolle & Company. The 1911 General Electric Company (GEC) Catalogue included several earthed sockets intended for industrial use.

British two-pin plugs and sockets

The earliest domestic plug and socket is believed to be that patented by T. T. Smith in 1883.<ref name="John Mellanby 1957">John Mellanby (1957), The History of Electric Wiring, Ch 10, London: Macdonald.</ref> This was shortly followed by patents from W. B. Sayers and G. Hookham; these early designs had rectangular plugs with contact plates on either side. In 1885, two-pin plug designs appeared and in 1889 there were two-pin plugs and sockets in the GEC catalogue. The 1893 GEC Catalogue included three sizes of what was described as Double plug Sockets with capacities described not in amps, but as "1 to 5 lights", "5 to 10 lights" and "10 to 20 lights". These were clearly recognisable as two-pin plugs and sockets, but with no indication as to pin size or spacing, they were sold as pairs. The same catalogue included lampholder plugs for both BC and ES lampholders (capacity unspecified), and also a type of two-pole concentric plug and socket (similar to a very large version of the concentric connectors used for laptop PC power connections) in the "1 to 5 lights" and "5 to 10 lights" capacities. Crompton and Company introduced the first two-pin socket with protective shutters in 1893, and the Edison & Swan Company was also manufacturing two-pin plug and sockets in the 1890s.

By the time the 1911 GEC Catalogue was published two-pin plugs and sockets were being offered with specifications in amps, but still with no indication as to pin size or spacing. The Midget Gauge was rated at 3 A, the Standard Gauge rated at 5 A, and the Union Gauge rated at 10 A. Also offered were two-way and three-way "T pieces" or multi-way adaptors for the 3 A and 5 A plugs, two-way only for the 10 A. Versions of the concentric plug and socket were now offered rated at 5 A and 10 A. At the same time Lundberg were offering the 2.5 A Dot, 5 A Universal, and 15 A Magnum, and Tucker were offering a range of 5 A, 10 A and 20 A plugs and sockets.

BS 73 Wall plugs and sockets (five ampere two-pin without earthing connection) was first published in 1915, and revised in 1919 with the addition of 15 A and 30 A sizes. By the 1927 revision of BS 73 four sizes of two-pin plugs and sockets were standardized: 2 A, 5 A, 15 A and 30 A. This was later superseded by BS 372:1930 part 1 Two-pin Side-entry Wall Plugs And Sockets for Domestic Purposes. Following the introduction of BS 4573 in 1970 there were no longer any UK domestic uses for two-pin sockets except for shavers, so BS 372 was renamed "Two-pin Side-entry Wall Plugs And Sockets For Special Circuits" and subsequently withdrawn.

BS 4573 (UK shaver)

BS 4573 British Standard Specification for two-pin reversible plugs and shaver socket-outlets defines a plug for use with electric shavers. The pin dimensions are the same as those of the 5 A plug specified in the obsolete BS 372:1930 part 1 (as shown in the table above). Unlike the original, the plug has insulated sleeves on the pins. Electric toothbrushes in the UK are normally supplied with the same plug. The sockets for this plug are rated at (and limited to) 200 mA. BS 4573 has no explicit specification for the plug rating, but Sheet GB6 of IEC 60083 states that a rating of 0.2 A applies to all BS 4573 accessories.

The BS 4573 socket is for use in rooms other than bathrooms. When installed in wet areas (e.g. bathrooms), for safety reasons it is normally found incorporated into a shaver supply unit which includes an isolation transformer and meets various mechanical and electrical characteristics specified by the BS EN 61558-2-5 safety standard to protect against shock in wet areas. Shaver supply units also typically accept a variety of 230 V two-pin plug types including BS 4573, Europlug Type C, and Australian two-pin plugs. The isolation transformer often includes a 115 V output that supplies a two-pin US Type A socket. Shaver supply units must also be current-limited; BS EN 61558-2-5 specifies a minimum rating of 20 VA and maximum of 50 VA. BS 4573 and BS EN 61558-2-5 both require sockets to be marked with the shaver symbol defined in the IEC Standard 60417-5225; the words "shavers only" are also often used but not required.

British three-pin (round) plugs and sockets
In the early 20th century, A. P. Lundberg & Sons of London manufactured the Tripin earthed plug available in 2.5 A and 5 A models. The Tripin is described in a 1911 book dealing with the electrical products of A. P. Lundberg & Sons and its pin configuration appears virtually identical to modern BS 546 plugs.

The first British standard for domestic three-pin plugs was BS 317 Hand-Shield and Side Entry Pattern Three-Pin Wall Plugs and Sockets (Two Pin and Earth Type) published in 1928. This was superseded in 1930 by BS 372 Side-Entry Wall Plugs and Sockets for Domestic Purposes Part II which states that there are only minor alterations from BS 317. In 1934, BS 372 Part II was in turn superseded by the first edition of BS 546 Two-Pole and Earthing-Pin Plugs and Socket Outlets. BS 546:1934 clause 2 specifies interchangeability with BS 372 Part II which includes the same four plug and socket sizes. (BS 372 Part I was a standard for two-pin non-earthed plugs which were never included in BS 546 and which were incompatible due to different pin spacings.)

Also in 1934 the 10th Edition of the IEE's "Regulations for the Electrical Equipment of Buildings" introduced the requirement for all sockets to have an earth contact.

Prior to BS 546, British Standards for domestic plugs and sockets included dimensional specifications for the socket contact tubes. In BS 546 there are no dimensions for socket contacts, instead they are required to make good contact with the specified plug pins.

Before the introduction of BS 317, GH Scholes (Wylex) introduced (in 1926) an alternative three-pin plug in three sizes, 5 A, 10 A and 15 A with a round earth pin and rectangular live and neutral pins. A fused 13 A version of this continued to be available after the introduction of BS 1363, illustrating that BS 546 was not used exclusively at any time.

Although still permitted by the UK wiring regulations, BS 546 sockets are no longer used for general purposes. Some of the varieties remain in use in other countries and in specialist applications such as stage lighting.

When BS 546 was in common use domestically in the UK the standard did not require sockets to be shuttered, although many were. The current revision of the standard allows optional shutters similar to those of BS 1363. Current UK wiring regulations require socket outlets installed in homes to be shuttered.

BS 546

There are four ratings of plug and socket in BS 546, (2 A, 5 A, 15 A and 30 A). Each has the same general appearance but they are different physical sizes to prevent interchangeability, they use pin spacing which is also different from the two pin plugs specified in BS 372, so earthed plugs will not fit into unearthed sockets, and vice versa. Plugs fitted with BS 546 fuses have been optional since the original BS 546:1934 with maximum fuse ratings of 2 A in the 2 A plug, and 5 A in the 5 A, 15 A and 30 A plugs. In practice most BS 546 plugs are unfused with fused versions being unusual and expensive.

The 15 ampere (A) sockets were generally given a dedicated 15 A circuit. Multiple 5 A sockets might be on a 15 A circuit, or each on a dedicated 5 A circuit. Lighting circuits fused at 5 A were generally used to feed the 2 A sockets. Adaptors were available from 15 A down to 5 A and from 5 A down to 2 A so in practice it was possible for an appliance with the smallest size of flex to be protected only by a 15 A fuse. This is a similar level of protection to that seen for portable appliances in other countries, but less than the protection offered by the BS 1363 fused plug.

The larger top pin is the earth connection, the left hand pin is neutral and the right hand pin is line when looking at a socket or at the rear of a plug.

2 ampere
This plug was used to connect low power appliances (and to adaptors from the larger socket types). It is sometimes still used to connect lamps to a lighting circuit.

5 ampere

This plug corresponds to Type D in the IEC table. In the UK it was used for moderate sized appliances, either on its own 5 A circuit or on a multi socket 15 A circuit, and also on many adaptors (both multi socket 5 A adaptors and adaptors that also had 15 A pins). This 5 A plug, along with its 2 A cousin, is sometimes used in the UK for centrally switched domestic lighting circuits, in order to distinguish them from normal power circuits; this is quite common in hotel rooms. This plug was also once used in theatrical installations for the same reasons as the 15 A model below.

15 ampere

This plug corresponds to Type M in the IEC table. It is the largest in domestic use and is commonly used in the UK for indoor dimmable theatre and architectural lighting installations.Robert S. Simpson (2003). Lighting control-technology and applications. Focal Press. . p. 512

30 ampere
The 30 A plug is the largest of the family. This was used for high power industrial equipment up to 7.2 kW, such as industrial kitchen appliances, or dimmer racks for stage lighting. Plugs and sockets were usually of an industrial waterproof design with a screw locking ring on the plug to hold it in the socket against waterproof seals, and sockets often had a screw cap chained to them to be used when no plug was inserted to keep them waterproof. Use of the BS 546 30 A plugs and sockets diminished through the 1970s as they were replaced with BS 4343 (which later became IEC 60309) industrial combo plugs and sockets.

Characteristics of BS 546 three-pin plugs
BS 546:1950 (current version confirmed October 2012) specifies pin dimensions only in decimal fractions of an inch, as shown below. The metric values are conversions provided here for convenience.

BS 1363 three-pin (rectangular) plugs and sockets
BS 1363 is a British Standard which specifies the common single-phase AC power plugs and sockets that are used in the United Kingdom. It has been adopted in many former British overseas territories. BS 1363 was introduced in 1947 as one of the new standards for electrical wiring in the United Kingdom used for post-war reconstruction. This plug corresponds to Type G in the IEC table. BS 1363 replaced the BS 546 plug and socket (which are still found in old installations or in special applications such as remotely switched lighting). Other exceptions to the use of BS 1363 plugs and sockets include equipment requiring more than 13 A, low-power portable equipment (such as shavers and toothbrushes) and mains-operated clocks.

History

In 1941 Lord Reith, then the minister of Works and Planning, established committees to investigate problems likely to affect the post-war rebuilding of Britain. One of these, the Electrical Installations Committee, was charged with the study of all aspects of electrical installations in buildings. Amongst its members was Dame Caroline Haslett, President of the Women's Engineering Society, Director of the Electrical Association for Women and an expert on safety in the home. Convened in 1942, the committee reported in 1944, producing one of a set of Post War Building Studies that guided reconstruction.

The plug and socket-outlet system defined in BS 1363 is a result of one of the report's recommendations. Britain had previously used a combination of 2 A, 5 A, and 15 A round pin sockets. In an appendix to the main report (July 1944), the committee proposed that a completely new socket-outlet and fused plug should be adopted as the "all-purpose" domestic standard. The main report listed eight points to consider in deciding the design of the new standard. The first of these was stated as, "To ensure the safety of young children it is of considerable importance that the contacts of the socket-outlet should be protected by shutters or other like means, or by the inherent design of the socket-outlet." Others included flush-fitting, no need for a switch, requirements for terminals, bottom entry for the cable, and contact design. The appendix added five further "points of technical detail" including requirements that plugs could not be inserted incorrectly, should be easy to withdraw, and should include a fuse.

This requirement for a new system of plugs and sockets led to the publishing in 1947 of "British Standard 1363:1947 Fused-Plugs and Shuttered Socket-Outlets".

One of the other recommendations in the report was the introduction of the ring circuit system (often informally called a "ring main"). In this arrangement a cable connected to a fuse, or circuit breaker, in the distribution board was wired in sequence to a number of sockets before being terminated back at the distribution board, thus forming a ring final circuit. In the ring circuit, each socket-outlet was supplied with current by conductors on both sides of the 'loop.' This contrasts with the radial circuit system (which is also used in the UK, often in the same installation) wherein a single cable runs out radially, like a spoke, from the distribution board to serve a number of sockets. Since the fuse or circuit breaker for a ring circuit has to be rated for the maximum current the ring could carry (30 A or 32 A for a breaker), additional protection is required at each socket-plug connection. Theoretically, such protection could have been designated either within the socket or within the plug. However, to ensure that this protection has a rating matched to the appliance flexible cord fitted to the plug, a fuse rated between 1 A and 13 A is incorporated into each plug. Wired connections may also be connected to the ring, and these are also required to include a suitably rated fuse. The ring circuit in the UK requires the use of BS 1363 plugs and sockets, but the BS 1363 system is not limited to use with ring circuits.

Chronology

BS 1363 is periodically revised and with supplements and amendments issued between major revisions. BS 1363:1984 and earlier versions dealt only with 13 A plugs and sockets. From 1989 onwards the standard was rearranged into five parts as follows:
 Part 1: Rewirable and non-rewirable 13 A fused plugs Part 2: 13 A Switched and unswitched socket-outlets Part 3: Adaptors Part 4: 13 A fused connection units: switched and unswitched Part 5: 13 A fused conversion plugsThe following chronology shows revisions, supplements and significant amendments.

June 1947: BS 1363:1947 "Fused-Plugs and Shuttered Socket-Outlets" published.

May 1950: BS 1363:1947 Amendment 3, title changed to "Specification for two-pole and earthing-pin fused-plugs and shuttered socket-outlets for A.C. circuits up to 250 Volts (not intended for use on D.C. circuits)".

January 1957: BS 1363:1947 Amendment 5, added clause permitting operation of shutters by simultaneous insertion of two or more pins (in addition to original method using only earth pin).

January 1957: BS 1363:1947 Supplement No. 1 added specification for surface mounted socket-outlets.

1957: Complementary standard published, BS 2814:1957 "Two-pole and earthing-pin flush-mounted 13-Amp switch socket-outlets for A.C. circuits up to 250 Volts". A separate standard specifying a switched version of the BS 1363 socket-outlet for use with BS 1363 plugs.

December 1960: BS 1363:1947 Supplement No. 2, added specification for Resilient Plugs.

December 1961: BS 2814:1957 Amendment 2, title simplified to "13 Ampere Switch Socket-Outlets".

1962: BS 2814:1957 Supplement No. 1 added specification for surface mounted switch outlets.

September 1967: BS 1363:1967 "Specification for 13A plugs, switched and unswitched socket-outlets and boxes" published. This standard superseded both BS 1363:1947 and BS 2814:1957. Only 3 A and 13 A fuses are specified. Resilient Plugs are included.

August 1984: BS 1363:1984 "Specification for 13 A fused plugs switched and unswitched socket-outlets" published. This standard superseded BS 1363:1967. Changes include the introduction of sleeved pins on Line and Neutral, metric dimensions replacing inches, specifications added for non-rewirable plugs and portable socket-outlets. The standard was aligned, where possible, with the proposed IEC standard for domestic plugs and socket-outlets.

February 1989: BS 1363-3:1989 "13 A plugs socket-outlets and adaptors - Part 3: Specification for adaptors" published. This new standard covers adaptors for use with BS 1363 socket-outlets and includes conversion adaptors (those which accept plugs of a different type), multiway adaptors (those which accept more than one plug, which may or may not be of a different type) and shaver adaptors. All adaptors (except for those accepting not more than two BS 1363 plugs) require to be fused. All sockets, including those to other standards, must be shuttered.

1994: A Product Approval Specification, PAS 003:1994, "Non-Rewirable 13 A Plugs with Plastic Socket Shutter Opening Pins" published. PAS 003 allowed for the design and approval of plugs without earthing intended for class II applications only. This was superseded by BS 1363-1:1995 but the PAS was not withdrawn until 23 July 2013.

February 1995: BS 1363-1:1995 "13 A plugs socket-outlets adaptors and connection units - Part 1: Specification for rewirable and non-rewirable 13 A fused plugs" published. This standard, together with BS 1363-2:1995, supersedes BS 1363:1984. The provisions of PAS 003 are incorporated, but the plastic pin is redesignated as an "ISOD".

September 1995: BS 1363-2:1995 "13 A plugs socket-outlets adaptors and connection units - Part 2: Specification for 13 A switched and unswitched socket-outlets" published.

September 1995: BS 1363-3:1995 "13 A plugs socket-outlets adaptors and connection units - Part 3: Specification for adaptors" published. Supersedes BS 1363-3:1989

November 1995: BS 1363-4:1995 "13 A plugs socket-outlets adaptors and connection units - Part 4: Specification for 13 A fused connection units switched and unswitched" published. A new standard.

August 2008: BS 1363-5:2008 "13 A plugs socket-outlets adaptors and connection units - Part 5: Specification for 13 A fused conversion plugs" published. A new standard.

May 2012: BS 1363-1:1995 +A4:2012 (Title unchanged) published. This amended standard allows switches to be incorporated into plugs, and introduced new overload tests amongst others. BS 1363-1:1995 remained current until 31 May 2015.

May 2012: BS 1363-2:1995 +A4:2012 (Title unchanged) published. This amended standard adds a requirement that it shall not be possible to operate a shutter by the insertion of a two-pin Europlug, and introduced new temperature rise tests amongst others. BS 1363-2:1995 remained current until 31 May 2015.

May 2012: BS 1363-4:1995 +A4:2012 (Title unchanged) published. Minor changes to BS 1363-4:1995 which remained current until 31 May 2015.

November 2012: BS 1363-3:1995 +A4:2012 (Title unchanged) published. This amended standard adds a requirement that it shall not be possible to operate a shutter by the insertion of a two-pin Europlug, and added specifications for switched adaptors amongst others. BS 1363-3:1995 will remain current until 31 December 2015.

August 2016: BS 1363-1:2016 (Title unchanged) published. Added requirements for incorporated electronic components and for electric vehicle charging. BS 1363-1:1995 +A4:2012 remained current until 31 August 2019.

August 2016: BS 1363-2:2016 (Title unchanged) published. Added requirements for incorporated electronic components and for electric vehicle charging. BS 1363-2:1995 +A4:2012 remained current until 31 August 2019.

August 2016: BS 1363-3:2016 (Title unchanged) published. Added requirements for incorporated electronic components. BS 1363-3:1995 +A4:2012 remained current until 31 August 2019.

August 2016: BS 1363-4:2016 (Title unchanged) published. Minor changes only. BS 1363-4:1995 +A4:2012 remained current until 31 August 2019.

August 2016: BS 1363-5:2016 (Title unchanged) published. Minor changes only. BS 1363-5:2008 remained current until 31 August 2019.

February 2018: BS 1363-1:2016 +A1:2018 (Title unchanged) published. BS 1363‑1:2016 is withdrawn and BS 1363‑1:1995+A4:2012 remained current until 31 August 2019.

BS 1363-1 Rewirable and non-rewirable 13 A fused plugs

Both line and neutral carry current and are defined as live parts. The earth pin also serves to operate the basic shutter mechanism used in many sockets. Correct polarity is established by the position of the earth pin relative to the other two pins, ensuring that the  pin is connected to the correct terminal in the socket-outlet. Moulded plugs for unearthed, double-insulated appliances may instead have a non-conductive plastic pin (an Insulated Shutter Opening Device or ISOD) the same size and shape as an earth pin, to open the shutters. When looking at the plug pins with the earth uppermost the lower left pin is line, and the lower right is neutral.

UK consumer protection legislation requires that most domestic electrical goods sold must be provided with fitted plugs to BS 1363-1. These are usually, but not necessarily, non-rewirable. Rewirable plugs for hand-wiring with a screwdriver are commonly available and must be provided with instructions.

Nominal dimensions
BS 1363-1 specifies the dimensions of plug pins and their disposition with respect to each other in precise, absolute terms. The  and neutral pins have a rectangular cross section 6.4 mm by 4.0 mm, 17.7 mm long and with centres 22.2 mm apart. The protective-earth pin is a rectangular cross section 8.0 mm by 4.0 mm, 22.3 mm long and with a centre line 22.2 mm from the line/neutral pin centre line. The dimensions were originally specified in decimal inches with asymmetric tolerances and redefined as minimum and maximum metric dimensions in BS 1363:1984.

Dimensions are chosen to provide safe clearance to live parts. This ensures that nothing can be inserted alongside a pin when the plug is in use and helps keep fingers away from the pins. The longer earth pin ensures that the earth path is connected before the live pins, and that it remains connected until after the live pins are disconnected.

Pin insulation
Plugs made to the recent revisions of the standard have insulated sleeves to prevent finger contact with pins, and also to stop metal objects (for example, fallen window blind slats) from becoming live if lodged between the wall and a partly pulled out plug. The length of the sleeves prevents any live contacts from being exposed while the plug is being inserted or removed. An early method of sleeving the pins involving spring-loaded sleeves is described in the 1967 British Patent GB1067870. The method actually adopted is described in the 1972 British Patent GB1292991. Plugs with such pins were available in the 1970s; a Southern Electricity/RoSPA safety pamphlet from 1978 encourages their use. Sleeved pins became required by the standard in 1984.

 Fuses (BS 1362) 

There are two common misconceptions about the purpose of the fuse in a BS 1363 plug: one is that it protects the appliance connected to the plug, and the other is that it protects against overloading. In fact the fuse is there to protect the flexible cord between the plug and the appliance under fault conditionsCook, Paul, "Commentary on IEE Wiring Regulations 16th Edition (BS 7671:2001)", Cl 6.8, IET 2002  (typical British ring circuits can deliver more current than appliance flexible power cords can handle).

BS 1363 plugs are required to carry a cartridge fuse, which must conform to BS 1362. Post-War Building Studies No. 11, Electrical Installations included the recommendation that "Provision should be made in the plug for the accommodation of a cartridge type of fuse for 13 amps., and alternatively, for 3 amps. Fuses of these ratings should be interchangeable and be readily identified." The original BS 1363:1947 specified fuse ratings of 3 A, 7 A and 13 A. The current version of the fuse standard, BS 1362:1973, allows any fuse rating up to 13 A, with 3 A (coloured red) and 13 A (coloured brown) as the preferred (but not mandated) values when used in a plug. All other ratings are to be coloured black. Most common in consumer retail outlets are fuses rated 3, 5 and 13 A; Professional suppliers also commonly stock fused rated 1, 2, 7, and 10 A.

Fuses are mechanically interchangeable; it is up to the end-user or appliance manufacturer to install the appropriate rating fuse. It has long been a common practice, although not a good one, for the maximum capacity 13A fuse to be supplied and used by default. More appropriate lower-capacity fuses are now supplied with some plugs instead. 

The standard specifies breaking time versus current characteristics only for 3 A or 13 A fuses. 
 For 3 A fuses: 0.02–80 s at 9 A, < 0.1 s at 20 A and < 0.03 s at 30 A.
 For 13 A fuses: 1–400 s at 30 A, 0.1–20 s at 50 A and 0.01–0.2 s at 100 A.

Other safety features

The plug sides are shaped to improve grip and make it easier to remove the plug from a socket-outlet. The plug is polarised, so that the fuse is in the  side of the supply. The flexible cord always enters the plug from the bottom, discouraging removal by tugging on the cable, which can damage the cable. Rewireable plugs must be designed so that they can be wired in a manner which prevents strain to the earth connection before the line and neutral connection in the event of failure of the cord anchorage.

Ratings
BS 1363 plugs and sockets are rated for use at a maximum of 250 V ac and 13 A, with the exception of non-rewirable plugs which have a current rating according to the type of cable connected to them and the fuse fitted. The rating must be marked on the plug, and in the case of non-rewirable plugs the marking must be the value of the fuse fitted by the plug manufacturer in accordance with table 2 of the standard. Typical ratings for non-rewirable plugs are 3 A, 5 A, 10 A and 13 A.

Counterfeits and non-standard plugs
Plugs which do not meet BS 1363 often find their way into the UK. Some of these are legal in the country they are manufactured in, but do not meet BS 1363 – these can be brought into the UK by unsuspecting travellers, or people purchasing electrical goods online. They can also be purchased through many UK electrical component distributors. There are also counterfeit plugs which appear to meet the standards (and are marked as such) but do not in fact comply. Legislation was introduced, with the last revision in 1994, to require plugs sold to meet the technical standard. Counterfeit products are regularly seized when found, to enforce the safety standards and to protect the approval marks and trademarks of imitated manufacturers. The pressure group PlugSafe reported in March 2014 that since August 2011 "thousands" of listings of products including illegal plugs had been removed from the UK sections of the websites eBay and Amazon Marketplace. The UK Electrical Safety Council expressed shock at the magnitude of the problem and published a video showing a plug exploding due to a counterfeit BS 1362 fuse. The Institution of Engineering and Technology also published information on the extent of the problem with on-line retailers, many advertising replacement cord sets, mobile device chargers, and travel adaptors fraudulently marked BS 1363, and mentioning the same sites.

BS 1363-2 13 A switched and unswitched socket-outlets

BS 1363 sockets are commonly supplied with integral switches as a convenience, but switches are optional and did not form part of BS 1363 until 1967.

Sockets are required to mate correctly with BS 1363 plugs (as opposed to the dimensions of the socket contacts being specified). This is checked by means of the use of various gauges which are specified in the standard; these gauges ensure that the socket contacts are correctly positioned and make effective and secure contact with the plug pins. There is no provision for establishing the interchangeability with any other device having plug pins incorporated, but which is not covered by BS 1363 (for example a charger or socket cover), unless that device conforms precisely to the plug pin dimensions specified. The insertion of non-compliant plugs may damage sockets. The important socket dimensions which the standard does specify are: A minimum insertion of 9.6 mm from the face of the socket-outlet to the first point of contact with a live part, a minimum distance of 9.5 mm from the line and neutral apertures to the periphery of the socket face, and not to exceed dimensions for the apertures of 7.2 mm × 4.8 mm (line and neutral) and 8.8 mm × 4.8 mm (earth).

When looking at the front of the socket with the earth aperture uppermost (as normally mounted) the lower left aperture is for the neutral contact, and the lower right is for the line contact.

Shutters
Many sockets use the original method of shutters opened by the earth pin (or plastic ISOD), longer than the other pins and hence opening the shutters before the other pins engage, alone. Some later designs require all three pins to be inserted simultaneously. The use of automatic shutters for protection dates back to at least 1927. Other countries, for example the USA, are gradually requiring their sockets to be protected by shutters.

There is a specific requirement in the standard to ensure that Europlugs and other two-pin plugs may not be used with BS 1363 sockets "It shall not be possible to operate a shutter by inserting a 2-pin plug into a 3-pin socket-outlet." However, many extension sockets will allow a plug to be inserted upside down, i.e. only the earth pin, defeating the shutter mechanism. This method is sometimes used to allow a Europlug (with two small round pins and no earth pin) to be forced into the open  and neutral ports. The UK Electrical Safety Council has drawn attention to the fire risk associated with forcing Europlugs into BS 1363 sockets.

Socket covers
In countries using un-shuttered socket-outlets, socket covers are sometimes sold to prevent children inserting objects into otherwise unprotected sockets. Such covers are also sometimes sold in the UK, but the shutters of the  socket-outlet make these unnecessary.  There has been publicity about the dangers of poor quality covers, most of which open the shutters when plugged in, but some of which then break apart on removal in a way that leaves the shutters open and the contact holes exposed, or some with poorly formed pins that can strain the contact springs and damage the socket. A 2012 article in the Institution of Engineering and Technology journal Wiring Matters concludes that "Socket protectors are not regulated for safety, therefore, using a non-standard system to protect a long established safe system is not sensible." In 2016 the use of socket covers was banned in premises controlled by the National Health Service (NHS) in the United Kingdom. BEAMA (British Electrotechnical and Allied Manufacturers Association) published the following statement in June 2017: "BEAMA strongly advises against the use of socket-outlet 'protective' covers." 

BS 1363-3 Adaptors

Plug adaptors permit two or more plugs to share one socket-outlet, or allow the use of a plug of different type. There are several common types, including double- and triple-socket blocks, shaver adaptors, and multi-socket strips. Adaptors which allow the use of non-BS 1363 plugs, or more than two BS 1363 plugs, must be fused. Appliances are designed not to draw more power than their plug is rated for; the use of such adaptors, and also multi-socketed extension leads, makes it possible for several appliances to be connected through a single outlet, with the potential to cause dangerous overloads.

Shaver adaptors

The purpose of these adaptors is to accept the two-pin plugs of shavers, they are required to be marked as such. Shaver adaptors must have a 1 A BS 646 fuse. They must accept UK shaver plugs complying with BS 4573 and also Europlugs and American two-pin plugs.

BS 1363-4 13 A fused connection units switched and unswitched

Switched and unswitched fused connection units, without sockets, use BS 1362 fuses for connection of permanently wired appliances to a socket-outlet circuit. They are also used in other situations where a fuse or switch (or both) is required, such as when feeding lighting off a socket-outlet circuit, to protect spurs off a ring circuit with more than one socket-outlet, and sometimes to switch feeds to otherwise concealed sockets for kitchen appliances.

BS 1363-5 13 A fused conversion plugs

A conversion plug is a special type of plug suitable for the connection of non-BS 1363 type plugs (to a recognized standard) to BS 1363 sockets. An example would be Class 2 appliances from mainland Europe which are fitted with moulded europlugs. Similar converters are available for a variety of other plug types. Unlike a temporary travel adaptor, conversion plugs, when closed, resemble normal plugs, although larger and squarer. The non-BS 1363 plug is inserted into the contacts, and the hinged body of the conversion plug is closed and fixed shut to grip the plug. There must be an accessible fuse. Conversion plugs may be non-reusable (permanently closed) or reusable, in which case it must be impossible to open the conversion plug without using a tool.

The Plugs and Sockets, etc. (Safety) Regulations 1994 permit domestic appliances fitted with non-BS 1363 plugs to be supplied in the UK with conversion plugs fitted, but not with conversion plugs supplied for fitting by the consumer.

BS 1363 variations

Folding plugs
Due to the size of the BS 1363 plug, attempts have been made to develop a compatible folding plug. As of July 2014 two folding plugs have been certified under specially developed ASTA standards. SlimPlug which complies with ASTA AS153 and ThinPlug which complies with ASTA AS158. SlimPlug is available only as part of a complete power lead terminating in an IEC 60320 C7 unpolarized (figure-of-eight) connector. In 2009 the ThinPlug received a "Red Dot" award for product design. The first product, also a power lead terminating in an IEC 60320 C7 unpolarized (figure-of-eight) connector became available in 2011.

Variant pin configurations
Several manufacturers have made deliberately incompatible variants for use where connection with standard plugs is not acceptable. Common uses include filtered supplies for computer equipment and cleaners' supplies in public buildings and areas (to prevent visitors plugging in unauthorised equipment). Examples are one design made by MK which has a T-shaped earth pin, and the Walsall Gauge 13 A plug, which has each pin rotated 90°, the latter being in use on parts of the London Underground for 110 V AC supply, and also in some British Rail offices for filtered computer supplies.

BS 8546 travel adaptors compatible with UK plug and socket system
BS 8546 applies to travel adaptors having at least one plug or socket-outlet portion compatible with BS 1363 plugs and socket-outlets. It was first published in April 2016 to provide a standard for travel adaptors suitable for the connection of a non-BS 1363 plug, or to a non-BS 1363 socket-outlet. It provides for an overall rating of 250 V AC, minimum current rating of 5 A, and a maximum of 13 A. Adaptors with BS 1363 plug pins must incorporate a BS 1362 fuse. BS 8546 travel adaptors may also include USB charging ports.

UK electric clock connector

Fused plugs and sockets of various proprietary and non-interchangeable types are found in older public buildings in the UK, where they are used to feed AC electric wall clocks. They are smaller than conventional sockets, commonly being made to fit BESA junction boxes, and are often of very low profile. Early types were available fused in both poles; later types fused in the line only and provided an earth pin. Most are equipped with a retaining screw or clip to prevent accidental disconnection. The prevalence of battery-powered quartz-controlled wall clocks has meant that this connector is rarely seen in new installations for clock use. However, it has found use where a low profile fused connector is required and is still available. A relatively common example of such a use is to supply power to an illuminated mirror that has limited clearance from the wall.

Obsolete non-BS types

Wylex plug

Prior to the first British Standard for earthed plugs, George H. Scholes of Manchester introduced plugs with a hollow round earth pin between rectangular current-carrying pins in 1926 under the Wylex brand name. The Wylex plugs were initially made in three ratings, 5 A, 10 A and 15 A and were unpolarized (the current-carrying pins were on the same centre line as the earth pin). In 1933 an asymmetric polarized version was introduced, with line pin slightly offset from the centre line. In 1934 the dual plug system was introduced with the socket rated at 15 A and three sizes of plug, fused 2 A and 5 A plugs and a 15 A plug. The 15 A "dual plug" incorporated a socket with narrower apertures than a standard Wylex 15 A socket, that accepted only the narrow rectangular pins of the lower-rated plugs. The introduction of a 13 A fused plug, rated as 3 kW, enabled Scholes to propose their system as a possible solution for the new standard competing with the Dorman & Smith round pin solution, but it was not selected and the completely new BS 1363 design prevailed. Wylex sockets were used in council housing and public sector buildings and, for a short time, in private housing. They were particularly popular in the Manchester area, although they were installed throughout England, mainly in schools, university accommodation, and government laboratories. In some London schools built in the 1960s they were used as low-voltage AC sockets, typically 12 V, 5 A from a transformer serving one or more laboratories, for microscope lamps etc. Wylex plugs and sockets continued to be manufactured for several years after BS 1363 sockets became standard and were commonly used by banks and in computer rooms during the 1960s and 1970s for uninterruptible power supplies or "clean" filtered mains supplies.

Dorman & Smith (D&S)

Made by Dorman & Smith (using patents applied for in 1943) the plugs and sockets were rated at 13 A and were one of the competing types for use on ring final circuits. They were never popular in private houses but were widely deployed in prefabricated houses, council housing and LCC schools. The BBC also used them. Some local authorities continued to use them in new installations until the late 1950s. Many D&S sockets were still in use until the early 1980s, although the difficulty in obtaining plugs for them after around 1970 often forced their users to replace them with BS 1363 sockets. The D&S plug suffered from a serious design fault: the line pin was a fuse which screwed into the plug body and tended to come unscrewed on its own in use. A fuse that worked loose could end up protruding from the socket, electrically live and posing a shock hazard, when the plug was removed.

International usage of BS types

Standards derived from BS 546

Indian IS 1293
Indian standard IS 1293:2005 Plugs and Socket-Outlets of Rated Voltage up to and including 250 Volts and Rated Current up to and including 16 Amperes includes versions of the 5 A and 15 A BS 546 connectors, but they are rated at 6 A and 16 A respectively. Some 6 A 3 pin sockets also have two extra holes above the line and neutral holes to allow a 5 A 2-pin plug to be connected.

Malaysian Standard MS 1577
MS 1577:2003 15 A plugs and socket-outlets for domestic and similar purposesRussian GOST 7396
The 2 A, 5 A, and 15 A connectors of BS 546 are duplicated by Group B1 of the GOST 7396 standard.

Singapore Standard SS 472
SS 472:1999 15 A plugs and switched socket-outlets for domestic and similar purposes. Also used in the Indonesian Riau Islands.

South African SANS 164

The South African standard SANS 164 Plug and socket-outlet systems for household and similar purposes for use in South Africa defines a number of derivatives of BS 546. A household plug and socket is defined in SANS 164-1, and is essentially a modernised version of the BS 546 15 A (the essential differences are that pins can be hollowed to reduce the amount of metal used, the dimensions are metricated, and it is rated 16 A). SANS 164-3 defines a 6 A plug and socket based on the BS 546 5 A. The South African Wiring Code now defines the plug and socket system defined in SANS 164-2 (IEC 60906-1) as the preferred standard, and it is expected that SANS 164-1 and SANS 164-3 devices will be phased out by around 2035.

SANS 164-4 defines three variants of the 16 A plug and socket intended for specialist (known as "dedicated") applications. The variants use a flattened earth pin, each at a different specified rotational position. This arrangement ensures that the dedicated plugs can all plug into an ordinary ("non-dedicated") socket, but that the various dedicated plug and socket combinations are not interchangeable (nor can a non-dedicated plug be inserted into a dedicated socket).

The dedicated versions have specific colours assigned to them, depending on the rotational position of the flattened portion. These are black (−53°), red (0°), and blue (+53°). The red (0°) version is by far the most common, and is widely used on computer and telecommunication equipment (although this is not required in the standard). In this application the "dedicated" socket refers to one that is not connected to a residual current circuit breaker, which is otherwise mandated for all normal power sockets.

International usage of Type D
The IEC World Plugs lists Type D as being used in the following locations: Bangladesh, Bhutan, Botswana, Chad, DR Congo, Dominica, French Guiana, Ghana, Guadeloupe, Guyana, Hong Kong, India, Iraq, Jordan, Lebanon, Libya, Macau, Madagascar, Maldives, Martinique, Monaco, Myanmar, Namibia, Nepal, Niger, Nigeria, Pakistan, Qatar, Saint Kitts and Nevis, Senegal, Sierra Leone, South Africa, Sri Lanka, Sudan, Tanzania, United Arab Emirates, Yemen, Zambia, Zimbabwe.

International usage of Type M
This plug is often used for air conditioners and washing machines. The IEC World Plugs lists Type M as being used in the following locations: Bhutan, Botswana, Eswatini, India, Israel, Lesotho, Macau, Malaysia, Mozambique, Namibia, Nepal, Pakistan, Singapore, South Africa, Sri Lanka,.

Standards derived from BS 1363

Irish I.S. 401
Irish Standard 401:1997 Safety requirements for rewirable and non-rewirable 13 A fused plugs for normal and rough use having insulating sleeves on live and neutral pins is the equivalent of BS 1363 in Ireland. The use of this standard is enforced by consumer protection legislation which requires that most domestic electrical goods sold in Ireland be fitted with an I.S. 401 plug.

Malaysian Standard MS 589
MS 589 parts 1,2,3 and 4 correspond to BS 1363-1, BS 1363-2, BS 1363-3 and BS 1363-4.

Russian GOST 7396
Group B2 of the GOST 7396 standard describes BS 1363 plugs and sockets.

Saudi Arabian Standard SASO 2203:2003
SASO 2203:2003 Plugs and socket-outlets for household and similar general use 220 VSingapore Standard SS 145
SS 145-1:2010 Specification for 13 A plugs and socket-outlets - Part 1 : Rewirable and non-rewirable 13 A fused plugsSS 145-2:2010 Specification for 13 A plugs and socket-outlets - Part 2 : 13 A switched and unswitched socket-outletsInternational usage of Type G
The IEC World Plugs'' lists Type G as being used in the following locations (outside the UK): Bahrain, Bangladesh, Belize, Bhutan, Botswana, Brunei Darussalam, Cambodia, Cyprus, Dominica, Falkland Islands, Gambia, Ghana, Gibraltar, Grenada, Guyana, Hong Kong, Iraq, Ireland, Isle of Man, Jordan, Kenya, Kuwait, Lebanon, Macau, Malawi, Malaysia, Maldives, Malta, Mauritius, Myanmar, Nigeria, Oman, Pakistan, Qatar, Saint Kitts and Nevis, Saint Lucia, Saint Vincent and the Grenadines, Saudi Arabia, Seychelles, Sierra Leone, Singapore, Solomon Islands, Sri Lanka, Tanzania, Uganda, United Arab Emirates, Vanuatu, Yemen, Zambia, Zimbabwe.

See also 

 AC power plugs and sockets
 Mains electricity by country

References

0
Electric power in the United Kingdom
Electrical safety in the United Kingdom
Electrical standards
Electrical wiring
Mains power connectors